Nehemiah Donnellan was Archbishop of Tuam from 1595 until his resignation in 1609.

Nehemiah Donnellan or Donellan may also refer to

 Nehemiah Donnellan (1649–1705), Irish lawyer
 Nehemiah Donnellan (1698–1770), Irish MP for Tipperary (Parliament of Ireland constituency)
 Nehemiah Nixon Donnellan (1722–1784), Irish MP for Clogher (Parliament of Ireland constituency)